Essex was a constituency represented in the House of Commons of the Parliament of the United Kingdom from 1290 until 1832. It elected two MPs, traditionally referred to as Knights of the Shire, to the House of Commons. It was divided into two single member constituencies (Essex North and Essex South) in the Great Reform Act.

Area covered (current units) 
East of England
Essex
London
Barking and Dagenham
Havering
Newham
Redbridge
Waltham Forest

Members of Parliament

1290-1640

1640-1832
 Apr 1640: Sir Thomas Barrington, Sir Harbottle Grimston
 Nov 1640: Lord Rich; Sir William Masham
 1641: Rich elevated to the House of Lords - replaced by Sir Martin Lumley
 1648: Lumley excluded under Pride's Purge
 1653: Joachim Matthews;  Henry Barrington;  John Brewster;  Christopher Earl;  Dudley Templer 
 1654: Sir William Masham Bt;  Sir Richard Everard, 1st Baronet of Much Waltham;  Sir Thomas Honywood;  Sir Thomas Bowes; Henry Mildmay (of Graces);  Thomas Coke  (of Pebmarsh);  Carew Mildmay;  Dionysius Wakering;   Edward Turnor;   Richard Cutts;   Oliver Raymond;  Herbert Pelham
 1656-1658: Sir Harbottle Grimston;  Sir Richard Everard, 1st Baronet of Much Waltham;  Sir Thomas Honywood;  Sir Thomas Bowes;  Henry Mildmay (of Graces);  Robert Barrington;  Carew Mildmay;  Dionysius Wakering;   Edward Turnor;   Dudley Temple;  Oliver Raymond;  Hezekiah Haynes;  John Archer

References

Parliamentary constituencies in the East of England (historic)
Parliamentary constituencies in Essex (historic)
Constituencies of the Parliament of the United Kingdom established in 1290
Constituencies of the Parliament of the United Kingdom disestablished in 1832